The Shrine of the Three Kings (German Dreikönigsschrein or Der Dreikönigenschrein), Tomb of the Three Kings, or Tomb of the Three Magi is a reliquary traditionally believed to contain the bones of the Biblical Magi, also known as the Three Kings or the Three Wise Men.  The shrine is a large gilded and decorated triple sarcophagus placed above and behind the high altar of Cologne Cathedral in western Germany.  Built approximately from 1180 to 1225, it is considered the high point of Mosan art and the largest reliquary in the Western world.

History

The "relics of the Magi" were originally situated at Constantinople, but brought to Milan in an oxcart by Eustorgius I, the city's bishop, to whom they were entrusted by the Emperor Constantine in 314. Eight centuries later in 1164, Holy Roman Emperor Frederick Barbarossa took the relics of the Magi from the church of Saint Eustorgio in Milan and gave them to the Archbishop of Cologne, Rainald of Dassel. The relics have since attracted a constant stream of pilgrims to Cologne."In the days of Philipp of Heinsberg the shrine of the three magi was built. This was told to me by some eyewitnesses who were present when the three magi were put into the shrine." — Vita EustorgiiParts of the shrine were designed by the famous medieval goldsmith Nicholas of Verdun, who began work on it in 1180 or 1181. It has elaborate gold sculptures of the prophets and apostles, and scenes from the life of Christ. The shrine was completed circa 1225.

Around 1199, King Otto IV gave three golden crowns, purported to be made for the three wise men, as a present to the church of Cologne. Because of the importance of the shrine and the cathedral for the later development of the city, the coat of arms of Cologne still shows these three crowns symbolizing the Three Kings.

Construction of the present Cologne Cathedral begun in 1248 to house these important relics. The cathedral took 632 years to complete and is now the largest Gothic church in northern Europe.

On 20 July 1864, the shrine was opened, revealing human remains and the coins of Philip I, Archbishop of Cologne. An eyewitness report reads:

"In a special compartment of the shrine now there showed – along with remains of ancient old rotten or moulded bandages, most likely byssus, besides pieces of aromatic resins and similar substances – numerous bones of three persons, which under the guidance of several present experts could be assembled into nearly complete bodies: the one in his early youth, the second in his early manhood, the third was rather aged. Two coins, bracteates made of silver and only one side stricken, were adjoined; one, probably from the days of Philipps von Heinsberg, displayed a church (See Note), the other showed a cross, accompanied by the sword of jurisdiction, and the crosier (bishop's crook) on either side."

Note: "Just as the coin of Philipp in Hartzheim, historia rei nummariae coloniensis Table 3 No. 14, 16, (1754), yet without its circumscription; the other (coin) is in square form, showed in the center a cross, accompanied by the sword of jurisdiction, and the crosier (bishop's crook) on either side, also without transcription, most certainly it is not younger and can be assumed perhaps to turn out to be a coin by Rainald [of Dassel]."

The bones were wrapped in white silk and returned to the shrine.

Description

Size and construction
It is shaped like a basilica: two sarcophagi stand next to each other, with the third sarcophagus resting on their roof ridges. The ends are completely covered, so there is no space visible between the sarcophagi. The basic structure is made of wood, with gold and silver overlay decorated with filigree, enamel, and over 1,000 jewels and beads. The latter include a large number of cameos and intaglio pieces, some pre-Christian.

Decoration
The entire outside of the shrine is covered with an elaborate decorative overlay.  There are 74 high relief figures in silver-gilt in all, not counting smaller additional figures in the background decoration. On the sides, images of the prophets decorate the lower part, while images of the apostles and evangelists decorate the upper part.  On the front end of the reliquary, there are (across the bottom, from left to right) images of the Adoration of the Magi, the Virgin Mary enthroned with the infant Jesus, and the Baptism of Christ, and above, Christ enthroned at the Last Judgment.  A removable filgree panel  reveals a grille displaying the names of Caspar, Melchior, and Balthasar. When the grille is removed, the skulls of the three Magi are shown wearing crowns. The other end of the reliquary shows scenes of the Passion: the scourging of Christ (lower left) and his crucifixion (lower left) with the resurrected Christ above. This end also has a bust of Rainald of Dassel in the center.

References

External links

 Dreikönigenschrein on the Cologne Cathedral site
 Information concerning the relics of the three kings (in German)
 Images of the shrine Requires some navigation: go to "image database", click "search page", type "dreikönigenschrein" in "Freitext" field, and click "Suchen" (search).
 Mark Rose, "The Three Kings & the Star"

Adoration of the Magi in art
Biblical Magi
Cologne Cathedral
Christian reliquaries
House-shaped shrines
Mosan art
Roman Catholic shrines in Germany
Romanesque art
Silver-gilt objects
Tourist attractions in Cologne